The Castle Lake Caddisfly Rhyacophila amabilis is an extinct species of insect in the caddisfly family Rhyacophilidae. It was endemic to the United States. It was first reported as extinct in 1986.

References

Spicipalpia
Insects of the United States
Insects described in 1965
Taxonomy articles created by Polbot
Extinct insects